Charles Hall may refer to:

Science and technology 
 Charles A. S. Hall (born 1943), American systems ecologist
 Charles Corydon Hall (1860–1935), American chemical engineer
 Charles Hall (economist) (1740–1825), British economist, physician, and early socialist
 Charles Hall Grandgent (1862–1939), American philologist and scholar
 Charles Martin Hall (1863–1914), American chemist

Other 
 Charles B. Hall (1920–1971), U.S. Army Air Corps officer with the Tuskegee Airmen
 Charles D. Hall (1888–1970), British-American art director and production designer
 Charles Francis Hall (1821–1871), American explorer of the Arctic
 Charles Francis Hall (bishop) (1908–1992), Episcopal bishop of New Hampshire
 Charles Hall (vice-chancellor) (1814–1883), English barrister and judge
 Charles Henry Hall (priest) (1763–1827), English Anglican churchman and academic
 Charles King Hall (1845–1895), English composer
 Charles P. Hall (1886–1953), United States Army general
 Charles Piers Egerton Hall (1919–1944), RAF pilot and Stalag Luft III escape participant

Sports 
 Charles Hall (American football) (1875–1945), American football coach in the United States
 Charles Hall (athlete) (1887–1972), American Olympic athlete
 Charles Hall (cricketer, born 1842) (fl. 1842–1867), English cricketer
 Charles Hall (cricketer, born 1848) (1848–1931), English cricketer
 Charles Hall (cricketer, born 1906) (1906–1976), English first-class cricketer
 Charles Hall (racing driver) (born 1979), British race car driver

Politics 
 Charles Hall (1690–1743), MP for Lincoln 1727–1734
 Charles Hall (Australian politician) (1851–1922), member of the Tasmanian Parliament
 Charles Hall Dillon (1853–1929), House of Representatives member from South Dakota
 Charles Hall (Holborn MP) (1843–1900), MP for Holborn, 1892–1900
 Charles Hall (MP for Lincolnshire) (fl. 1619–1669), English politician who sat in the House of Commons in 1654 and 1656
 Charles Hall (New Zealand politician) (1843–1937), New Zealand politician
 Charles Hall (Wisconsin politician) (1847–1909), Wisconsin politician

See also 
 Charlie Hall (disambiguation)
 Charles Henry Hall (disambiguation)